Clarendon High School for Girls is a public English medium high school for girls situated in the suburb of Selborne of East London in the Eastern Cape province of South Africa. It was founded in 1903 as East London Girls' High School, The brother school is Selborne College, It is one of the oldest school for girls in South Africa.

History
In 1872, Panmure Public School, a co-educational school, was founded by the German immigrant, Heinrich Muller. The boys' section became Selborne College in 1907, whereas the girls' section moved to Park Avenue in 1886 before becoming a separate school for girls from grades 1 to 10 in 1903. It was originally between Muir Street and Oxford Street, on the site currently occupied by Grens Primary but having then just been vacated by an Uitlander Refugee camp. In 1905, a new uniform was introduced, consisting of a navy gym with green and white colours on the blazers and hats. A school hostel was also established that year. In 1937, the upper grades were moved to new premises on the corner of Connaught Avenue and Oxford Street, and the lower grades remained as a separate school. The name "Clarendon" was given to both schools in 1957, after the former Governor-General of South Africa and his wife, the Lord and Lady Clarendon. In 1959, a "Clarendon green" uniform was introduced. In 1964 the school hostel, Connaught House, was destroyed by fire. The new hostel was opened in 1967. The school adopted a non-racial admissions policy in 1991.

Houses
Miss Donald, headmistress from 1925 to 1945, introduced the prefect system in 1933 and in 1934 appointed the first headgirl, Betty Chew, who was later a teacher at the school and coached the first hockey team until the 1980s. She also created the houses, and named them after Marjorie Ketchen (headmistress from 1912 to 1925), Miss Gittins who became Mrs Booty, and Mrs Hunter, a teacher. These ladies donated the inter-house shield which is still competed for.

Sport

Sports played at the school are:

 Athletics
 Chess 
 Cross country
 Cycling 
 Equestrian 
 Hockey
 Netball
 Rowing
 Squash
 Swimming
 Table tennis
 Tennis
 Water polo

Notable alumnae

Joan Harrison, retired South African swimmer who won the 100 m backstroke event at the 1952 Olympics
Marcelle Keet, waterpolo, hockey
Candice Forword, hockey
Lana Marks, fashion designer and American ambassador to South Africa
Soso Rungqu, actress & singer.
Bianca Wood, hockey

See also
List of High Schools in South Africa

References

External links

Educational institutions established in 1903
Schools in the Eastern Cape
Girls' schools in South Africa
1903 establishments in the Cape Colony
Boarding schools in South Africa
East London, Eastern Cape